The common ringtail possum (Pseudocheirus peregrinus, Greek for "false hand" and Latin for "pilgrim" or "alien") is an Australian marsupial.

It lives in a variety of habitats and eats a variety of leaves of both native and introduced plants, as well as flowers, fruits and sap. This possum also consumes a special type of faeces that is produced during the daytime when it is resting in a nest.  This behaviour is called caecotrophy and is similar to that seen in rabbits.

Taxonomy
The common ringtail possum is currently classified as the only living species in the genus Pseudocheirus; the species of Pseudochirulus and other ringtail genera were formerly also classified in Pseudocheirus. Several subspecies have been described, such as the Western Australian Pseudocheirus peregrinus occidentalis, but the entire population may be a species complex.
The arrangement as the only extant species of Pseudocheirus is:
Pseudocheirus peregrinus pereginus, the type subspecies based on a collection made at Endeavour River
Pseudocheirus peregrinus convolutor, (Eastern ringtail possum or Southeastern ringtail possum)
Pseudocheirus peregrinus pulcher, (Rufous ringtail possum)
Pseudocheirus peregrinus occidentalis, called the Western ringtail possum, found in the south west of the country. Taxonomic opinion favours regarding this as a separate species, Pseudocheirus occidentalis, though the currently contradictory evidence would not allow this recommendation to be formalised.

Description
It has grey or black fur with white patches behind the eyes and usually a cream-coloured belly. It has a long prehensile tail which normally displays a distinctive white tip over 25% of its length. The back feet are syndactyl, which helps it to climb. The ringtail possum's molars have sharp and pointed cusps.

Distribution and habitat
The common ringtail possum ranges on the east coast of Australia, as well as Tasmania and a part of southwestern Australia. They generally live in temperate and tropical environments and are rare in drier environments. Ringtail possums prefer forests of dense brush, particularly eucalyptus forests. The common ringtail possum and its relatives occupy a range of niches similar to those of lemurs, monkeys, squirrels, and bushbabies in similar forests on other continents.  It is less prolific and less widespread than the common brushtail possum.

Behaviour
The common ringtail possum is nocturnal and well adapted to arboreal life. It relies on its prehensile tail and sometimes will descend to the ground. They communicate with soft, high-pitched, and twittering calls.

Diet and foraging
The common ringtail possum feeds on a wide variety of plants in the family Myrtaceae including the foliage, flowers and fruits from shrubs and lower canopy. Some populations are also known to feed on the leaves of cypress pine (Callitris), wattles (Acacia spp.) and plant gum or resins.

When foraging, ringtail possums prefer young leaves over old ones. One study found the emergence of young possums from their pouches corresponds to the flowering and fruiting of the tea-tree, Leptospermum and the peak of fresh plant growth. Young eucalypt leaves are richer in nitrogen and have less dense cell walls than older leaves; however, the protein gained from them is less available due to higher amounts of tannins. When feeding, the possum's molars slice through the leaves, slitting them into pieces. The possum's caecum separates the fine particles from the coarse ones. These particles stay in the caecum for up to 70 hours where the cell walls and tanned cytoplasts are partially digested.

What distinguishes the digestive system of the common ringtail possum from that of the koala and the greater glider is the caecal content transfers directly back to the stomach. Because of this, the ringtail possum is able to gain more protein. This is also done by lagomorphs like rabbits and pikas. Hard faeces are produced during the night while feeding and are not eaten, while soft faeces are produced during the day during rests and are eaten.

Metabolism

The re-ingestion of caecal content also serves to maintain the ringtail possum's energy balance. Ringtail possums gain much of their gross energy from reingestion. The common ringtail possum has a daily maintenance nitrogen requirement (MNR) of 290 mg N/kg0.75. Common ringtail possums gain much of their MNR from consuming their nitrogen-rich caecal pellets. They would have to gain 620 mg N/kg0.75 otherwise. The ringtail possum recycles 96% of its liver's urea, which is then transferred into the caecum and made into bacterial protein. Only re-ingestion makes this effective and the bacterial protein must be digested in the stomach and the amino acids subsequently absorbed in the small intestine. This recycling also allows the possum to conserve water and urinate less. Reingestion allows the possum to live on low nitrogen eucalyptus leaves which is particularly important during late lactation. It has been found that at higher temperatures, the common ringtail possum consumes less food due to a limited ability to metabolize toxins found in their diet. Because 55% of their water intake comes from the leaves and foliage they consume, their metabolic rate must remain low and stable while facing water loss.

Nesting
Common ringtail possums live a gregarious lifestyle which centres on their communal nests, also called dreys. Ringtail possums build nests from tree branches and occasionally use tree hollows. A communal nest is made up of an adult female and an adult male, their dependant offspring and immature offspring of the previous year. A group of ringtail possums may build several dreys at different sites. Ringtail possums are territorial and will drive away any strange conspecifics from their nests. A group has a strong attachment to their site. In one experiment, in which a group was removed from their territory, it remained uncolonised for the following two years. Ringtail possum nests tend to be more common in low scrub and less common in heavily timbered areas with little under-story. Dreys contribute to the survival of the young when they are no longer carried on their mother's back.

Reproduction and growth

The common ringtail possum carries its young in a pouch, where it develops. Depending on the area, the mating season can take place anywhere between April and December. The majority of the young are born between May and July. The oestrous cycle of ringtail possum lasts 28 days. It is both polyoestrous and polyovular. If a female prematurely loses her litter, she can return to oestrous and produce a second litter in October as a replacement if conditions are right. The average litter is two, although there are very occasionally triplets. Common ringtail possum young tend to grow relatively slowly due to dilute milk with low lipid levels that is provided to the young. As with other marsupials, the common ringtail possum's milk changes through lactation. During the second phase of lactation, more solid foods are eaten, especially when the young first emerges from the pouch. During this time, the concentration of carbohydrates fall, while those of proteins and lipids reach their highest. The long lactation of the ringtail possums may give the young more time to learn skills in the communal nest as well as to climb and forage in the trees.

The young are first able to vocalise and open their eyes between 90 and 106 days of age. They leave their mother's pouch at 120–130 days. However, lactation usually continues until 180–220 days after birth but sometimes ends by 145 days. Both sexes become sexually mature in the first mating season after their birth.

Status
Common ringtail possum populations severely declined during the 1950s. However, populations seem to have recovered in recent times. Because they are largely arboreal, common ringtail possums are particularly affected by deforestation in Australia. They are also heavily predated upon by the introduced red fox.  They are also hit by cars, or killed by snakes, cats and dogs in suburban areas.

References

Mammals of New South Wales
Mammals of Queensland
Mammals of South Australia
Mammals of Tasmania
Mammals of Victoria (Australia)
Possums
Mammals described in 1785